Aemilia tabaconas is a moth of the family Erebidae. It was described by James John Joicey and George Talbot in 1916. It is found in Peru.

References

Moths described in 1916
Phaegopterina
Moths of South America